Public Exchanges are trading venues open to all interested parties (many sellers and many buyers) that use a common technology platform and that are usually run by third parties or industry consortia. Public exchanges support community activities like distributing industry news, sponsoring online discussion groups, blogging and providing research.

See also 
 Marketplace
 Freelance marketplace
 Exchange (organized market)

References

Online marketplaces
Exchange